Butler Creek is a stream in the U.S. states of Arkansas and Missouri. It is a tributary of the White River.

The stream source is southeast of Seligman and it flows east to northeast for about 3.5 miles then turns southeast for about three miles to enter Arkansas north of Busch. East of Busch, the stream crosses under Arkansas Route 187. The stream runs parallel to that road for about 2.5 miles to its confluence with the White River just upstream from Beaver.

Butler Creek was named after the local Butler family.

See also
List of rivers of Arkansas
List of rivers of Missouri

References

Rivers of Carroll County, Arkansas
Rivers of Barry County, Missouri
Rivers of Arkansas
Rivers of Missouri